Mühldorf am Inn (Central Bavarian: Muihdorf am Inn) is a town in Bavaria, Germany, and the capital of the district Mühldorf on the river Inn.

History
During the Middle Ages, the town and castle were an alod of the Luchen family.  On 28 October 1287, Rapoto Luchen announced that he had entered an agreement with Archbishop Rudolph of Salzburg to hand over the alod, become the archbishop's ministerialis, and thereafter run the lands as a fief of the Prince-Archbishops of Salzburg.

On 28 September 1322, the decisive Battle of Mühldorf was fought here between Bavaria and Salzburg.  Before the battle, the Prince-Archbishop of Salzburg knighted several of the burghers of the town.

In 1802, Mühldorf became part of Bavaria.

During World War II, it was the site of the Mühldorf concentration camp complex. Several Allied air raids directed at the area were designed to target the rail links into Munich and disrupt the transportation of materiel from the "Innwerk" industrial park in Töging am Inn. Around 44 U.S. Air personnel are thought to have perished during the return flight following one of these raids. Civilian casualties are believed to be much higher due to many aircraft crews being unable to identify their primary objectives.

References

Further reading
Freed, John B. Noble Bondsmen: Ministerial Marriages in the Archdiocese of Salzburg, 1100-1343. (Ithaca, NY: Cornell University Press, 1995)

 
Mühldorf (district)
Populated places on the Inn (river)